Morley South is an electoral ward of Leeds City Council in south west Leeds, West Yorkshire, covering the town of Morley and west Tingley.

Boundaries 
The Morley South ward includes the majority of the civil parish of Morley, except for its north western section sitting in Morley North ward. The entire parish is also overseen by Morley Town Council.

Councillors 

 indicates seat up for re-election.
* indicates incumbent councillor.

Elections since 2010

May 2022

May 2021

May 2019

May 2018

May 2016

May 2015

May 2014

May 2012

May 2011

May 2010

Notes

References

Places in Leeds
Wards of Leeds